Adi Quala Subregion is a subregion in the southern Debub region (Zoba Debub) of Eritrea. Its capital lies at Adi Quala.

References

Subregions of Eritrea

Southern Region (Eritrea)
Subregions of Eritrea

Population  Adi qaula eritrea more Than 30 People